Woodside is a historic home located at Mt. Pleasant, New Castle County, Delaware.  It was built about 1860, and is a two- to three-story, five-bay, "L"-shaped brick dwelling with a center passage plan with a full width front porch. It features hipped roof with widely overhanging eaves and elaborate brackets in the Italianate style. Also on the property are a contributing stable, granary, cattle/dairy barn, equipment shed and water tower.  It was built by Henry Clayton, whose great-grandfather was Governor Joshua Clayton, president and governor of Delaware.

It was listed on the National Register of Historic Places in 1985.

References

Houses on the National Register of Historic Places in Delaware
Italianate architecture in Delaware
Houses completed in 1860
Houses in New Castle County, Delaware
National Register of Historic Places in New Castle County, Delaware